Önder Turacı (born 14 July 1981) is a Turkish former footballer who played as a defender.

International career
Turacı was a Belgian U-21s and played in the 2002 UEFA European Under-21 Football Championship. He was included in the squad of Turkish senior team in series of friendlies in summer 2004, and made his debut on 18 August 2004, a friendly match against Belarus.

At that time the new FIFA status was in force since 1 January 2004, and had loosened the nationality transfer of players aged under 21. A provision clause of 1 year effectiveness also came in force that any player who already played for one nation youth side, but not the senior, had a chance to apply for nationality transfer, regardless of their age. Any players that already were allowed to play in official match on a senior team, means the transfer was automatically done. But in Turacı case, his transfer was uncertain, and Belgian senior team once tried to recall him in February 2006. After the rule change by FIFA, he was able to play on the Turkish national team in 2009.

Honours
 2005 Turkish Super League National Champions with Fenerbahçe
 2007 Turkish Super League National Champions with Fenerbahçe

References

External links

 
 
 
 

1981 births
Living people
Footballers from Liège
Turkish footballers
Turkey international footballers
Belgian people of Turkish descent
Belgian footballers
Belgium under-21 international footballers
Belgium youth international footballers
R.A.A. Louviéroise players
Standard Liège players
Fenerbahçe S.K. footballers
Kayserispor footballers
Mersin İdman Yurdu footballers
Belgian Pro League players
Süper Lig players
C.S. Visé players
TFF First League players
Association football defenders